The Official Audio Streaming Chart (previously the Official Streaming Chart) is a music chart based on plays of songs through audio streaming services (including Spotify, Deezer, Google Play Music, Apple Music and Tidal) in the United Kingdom. It features data from both premium and ad-supported services. It is compiled weekly by the Official Charts Company (OCC), and was initially published both on their official website OfficialCharts.com (Top 100), and in the magazine Music Week (Top 75).

As of the chart dated 12 July 2014 —the date of inclusion of streaming data into the UK Singles Chart— the Official Streaming Chart was relaunched as the Official Audio Streaming Chart. The Top 100 is published on the OCC website. The first song to top the rebranded chart was "Sing" by Ed Sheeran.

The chart was first launched on 14 May 2012. Its first number one was "Call Me Maybe" by Carly Rae Jepsen. At the time of the chart's launch, the most streamed artist of the year was Ed Sheeran. Sheeran remarked that streaming services had "always been an important way for [him] to get music out to [his] fans". Martin Talbot, managing director of the OCC, stated that the chart represented "a true coming-of-age moment for music streaming in the UK".

In 2015, an Official Albums Streaming Chart was launched. This uses the same streaming sources as the Official Audio Streaming Chart to measure how many times albums have been streamed each week.

Number ones

See also
 List of Official Subscription Plays Chart number ones

Notes

References

External links
  at the Official Charts Company

British record charts
Lists of number-one songs in the United Kingdom